Saint-Myon is a commune in the Puy-de-Dôme department in Auvergne in central France.

History
Saint-Myon has a bridge, which was destroyed during World War II to prevent German troops from passing.

See also
Communes of the Puy-de-Dôme department

References

Saintmyon
Puy-de-Dôme communes articles needing translation from French Wikipedia